Prof Joseph Strickland Goodall FRSE FRCSE (1874–1934) was a British physician, clinical cardiologist and physiologist. The triennial Strickland Goodall Memorial Lecture is named in his memory, and addresses cardiac issues.

Life

He was born in 1874 the son of Anne Strickland Blaydes (d.1908) and her husband, Joseph Goodall (d.1901), senior surgeon in the Queensland Government Service. He was educated at Harrow School and Eastbourne then studied Medicine at the University of London graduating with an MB. He did postgraduate study at the University of Edinburgh and in Paris. He became Professor of Physiology and Biology at the City of London Hospital.

In 1910 he was elected a Fellow of the Royal Society of Edinburgh. His proposers were John William Henry Eyre, John Cameron, Sir Thomas Oliver, and Arthur Robinson.

In 1914 he joined Dr Frederick William Price as a Physician at the newly built National Heart Hospital on Westmoreland Street in London.

He died on 22 November 1934.

Family

He married Amelia Hunt. Their son, John Strickland Goodall became a famous artist and illustrator.

Publications

The Electrical and Histological Manifestations of Thyrotoxic Myocarditis (1927)
The  Growth of Heart Disease in This and Other Countries (1928)
Myocarditis: The St Cyres Memorial Lectures (published 1937)

Memorial lectures
1939 – Diseases of the Heart – lecturer unknown
1948 – title not known – Prof John McMichael
1951 – The Heart in Thyrotoxicosis – T Jenner Hoskin
1954 – An Appreciation of Mitral Valve Disease – Dr Paul Wood
1957 – The Results of Surgical Treatment on Congenital Heart Diseases – Dr Maurice Campbell
1969 – The Nature of the Coronary Problem – Arthur Morgan Jones

References

1874 births
1934 deaths
Fellows of the Royal Society of Edinburgh
British cardiologists
20th-century British medical doctors
People educated at Harrow School
Alumni of the University of London